Corinne Renae Callahan (born May 6, 1985) is an American soccer coach, artistic photographer and former goalkeeper.

University career 

Callahan had a standout career at the University of Portland from 2003 through 2006, where she backstopped the Pilots to the 2005 NCAA Division I national championship, capping off an undefeated season.  She saved two penalty kicks in the penalty shootout of the semi-final match against Penn State; that performance helped to name her the NCAA tournament's Defensive Most Valuable Player.

At Portland, she became the program's all-time leader in saves with 263, shutouts with 39, and finished with a 0.59 goals against average (GAA), which is fifth in program history, earning All-American status.

Professional career 

After leaving Portland, Callahan moved on to the W-League, where she played for the Vancouver Whitecaps in 2007 and the Seattle Sounders in 2008.

On October 6, 2008, she was drafted in the first round (seventh overall) by Sky Blue FC in the 2008 WPS General Draft. She remained on the roster for Sky Blue in WPS throughout the 2009 season, earning a winner's medal for the inaugural WPS Championship.

International career 

Callahan has won caps for the United States at the under-21 and under-23 levels.  For the U-21s, she started every match in the 2007 Nordic Cup, and returned to the Nordic Cup with the U-23 team in 2006, 2007, and 2008.

Photography 

Callahan is the founder of a photography site, Cori Alexander Photography, which displays her portfolio containing a number of galleries. These galleries include images of nature settings, bridges such as the Golden Gate Bridge and the Brooklyn Bridge, and an ongoing collection titled "365", designed to capture one moment for every day of the year.

Personal life 

Callahan's brother, Clint Alexander, is the director of East Coast casting for the Fox Broadcasting Company.  Her mother works for the Contra Costa Times, and her father has battled multiple sclerosis for many years. Portions of sales that she makes out of her photography site go to the National Multiple Sclerosis Society. She married Matt Callahan in May 2015, and has three children.

References

External links 
Portland player profile
Portland 2006 statistics
Sky Blue FC player profile
Cori Alexander Photography

1985 births
Living people
NJ/NY Gotham FC players
Seattle Sounders Women players
Portland Pilots women's soccer players
Vancouver Whitecaps FC (women) players
USL W-League (1995–2015) players
American women's soccer players
Women's association football goalkeepers
American women's soccer coaches
Female association football managers
San Diego Toreros women's soccer coaches
California Golden Bears women's soccer coaches